Vanestanaq (also Romanized as Vānestānaq; also known as Vanestānak) is a village in Ojarud-e Sharqi Rural District, Muran District, Germi County, Ardabil Province, Iran. At the 2006 census, its population was 229, in 51 families.

References 

Towns and villages in Germi County